Campeau is a surname. Notable people with the surname include:

Charles-Édouard Campeau (born 1916), politician
Frank Campeau (1864–1943), actor
Jean Campeau (born 1931), businessman and politician
Lucien Campeau (died 2010), cardiologist
Robert Campeau (born 1923), businessman
Rychard Campeau (born 1952), ice hockey player
Tod Campeau (1923–2009), ice hockey player
Jennifer Campeau (born 1973), politician

See also
Campeau Corporation, real estate company
Commission on the Political and Constitutional Future of Quebec, aka the Bélanger-Campeau Commission